North Fork Stewarts Creek is a  long 1st order tributary to Stewarts Creek in Carroll County, Virginia.  This stream. along with South Fork Stewarts Creek, forms Stewarts Creek.

Course 
North Fork Stewarts Creek rises about 0.25 miles south of Felt Knob in Carroll County and then flows generally southeast to join Stewarts Creek about 2 miles northwest of Lambsburg, Virginia.

Watershed 
North Fork Stewarts Creek drains  of area, receives about 53.5 in/year of precipitation, has a wetness index of 282.42, and is about 62% forested.

See also 
 List of Rivers of Virginia

References 

Rivers of Carroll County, Virginia
Rivers of Virginia